Farmers Market, more commonly called Penn Market and also known as York Farmers' Market or Market & Penn Street Farmers' Market, is a historic public market located in York, Pennsylvania.  It was built in 1876 and expanded about 1890.  The original section is a simple 60 feet wide and 80 feet long gable roofed brick building.  A 40 foot wide rectangular section was added in the expansion and the two sections were joined under a single, moderately pitched gable roof.  With the expansion, a five bay wide false front was added to unify the building. The front facade features two ornamental circular windows. Attached to the main building are three auxiliary buildings including a Queen Anne style stable.

It was added to the National Register of Historic Places in 1976.

References

External links
Penn Market

York
Commercial buildings on the National Register of Historic Places in Pennsylvania
Queen Anne architecture in Pennsylvania
Commercial buildings completed in 1876
Commercial buildings completed in 1890
Buildings and structures in York, Pennsylvania
National Register of Historic Places in York County, Pennsylvania